Jetta (full name Jetta John-Hartley) is an English singer-songwriter and record producer from Liverpool who is based in London. She is best known for her songs "I'd Love to Change the World (Matstubs Remix)" and "Feels Like Coming Home".

Early life
Jetta was born and raised in Liverpool by her sound engineer father and vocal coach mother.

When she was 15 years old, Jetta was gifted the music editing software Logic on which she taught herself to produce music.

Career
In 2012, Jetta released a self-shot music video for her song "Start A Riot" which gained thousands of views in its first week on YouTube and brought her significant attention. She further received recognition in 2013 when her song "Feels Like Coming Home" (produced by Jim Eliot) was chosen as the soundtrack for the Google Zeitgeist 2013 – Year In Review which gained more than 33M views. In 2015, the song was used in the tenth episode of the eleventh season of Grey's Anatomy. In 2014, for a limited time only, a soft EP release, titled Start a Riot, was made available in the UK and US, to critical acclaim, including iTunes Single Of The Week.

The same year, her cover of Ten Years After's song "I'd Love To Change The World" was used in a trailer for Dawn of the Planet of the Apes, the first trailer for the movies Nightcrawler and Terminator Genisys, and in the first episode of the fourth season of CBS' TV series Person of Interest. In 2015, electronic producer Matstubs released a remix of Jetta's cover of the song. The song received significant attention after being posted to the Trap Nation YouTube channel. It then hit gold, generating over 200 million plays on YouTube, and 120 million on Spotify, becoming her most listened to song. In 2017, L'Orchestra Cinématique released the remix cover of the song on the trailer for Star Trek: Discovery.

Her self-produced EP Tonic was released on August 24, 2018. The singles "Fool" and "Enemy In Me" were both added to New Music Friday on Spotify on the day of their release.

Jetta has co-written songs for rapper Machine Gun Kelly ("Merry Go Round"), girl group Neon Jungle ("Louder", "Fool Me"), DJ Sam Feldt ("Runaways"), and singers  P!nk ("More"), Medina ("Runnin Out of Love", "We Survive") and Ashley Roberts ("Clockwork").

Between 2019 and 2020, Jetta released four standalone singles, "No Fire", "Livin'", "I Wanna Know" and "Taste". The same year, her song "Feels Like Coming Home" was included in the soundtrack of the football documentary The End of the Storm.

Jetta announced on Instagram that she will release her new single "He Usually Likes Boys" on 22 July 2021. The artist released "Honey", her latest single, on December 3 the same year. On August 12, 2022, she released the extended play Livin' which was composed of her four previously released singles (including "Livin'") and two stripped versions of "Livin" and "No Fire".

Discography

Extended plays

Singles

Featured singles

Other appearances

References

External links
Jetta - I'd Love to Change the World (Matstubs Remix) @ YouTube
Matstubs Remix of 'I'd Love To Change The World' Feat Jetta Now Has a Video: Exclusive Premiere
10 New Artists You Need to Know: March 2014
Google's 'Zeitgeist' Top Searches For 2013 Revealed
Watch new talent Jetta in session for Best Fit

1989 births
Living people
English women singer-songwriters
British women singer-songwriters